The Commandant's Residence Home is located in King, Waupaca County, Wisconsin.

History
The construction of the house was commissioned by the Grand Army of the Republic to house veterans. It was listed on the National Register of Historic Places in 1985 and on the State Register of Historic Places in 1989.

It is located in the Veterans Cottages Historic District.

References

Houses on the National Register of Historic Places in Wisconsin
National Register of Historic Places in Waupaca County, Wisconsin
Queen Anne architecture in Wisconsin
Houses completed in 1888